Jacques Cloutier (born January 3, 1960) is a Canadian former professional ice hockey goaltender who played in the National Hockey League (NHL) with the Buffalo Sabres, Chicago Blackhawks, and Quebec Nordiques between 1981 and 1994. He is currently an assistant coach working under Bob Hartley with Avangard Omsk of the Kontinental Hockey League (KHL). Internationally Cloutier played for the Canadian national team at the 1986 World Championships, winning a bronze medal.

Playing and coaching career

Selected in the 1979 NHL Entry Draft by the Buffalo Sabres, Cloutier also played for the Chicago Blackhawks and Quebec Nordiques. Upon his retirement in 1994, he became goaltending coach of the Nordiques, a position he held when the franchise moved to Denver and became the Colorado Avalanche. In 1996, he became an assistant coach for Colorado, winning the Stanley Cup in 1996 and 2001. He was let go by the Avalanche on June 3, 2009. He also served as an assistant coach with the Calgary Flames, relieved of that position on May 3, 2016.

He was the starting goaltender on the 1982–1983 Calder Cup champion Rochester Americans, the American Hockey League affiliate of the Buffalo Sabres. In 2000, he was inducted into the Americans Hall of Fame.

Career statistics

Regular season and playoffs

International

References

External links
 
 Profile at hockeydraftcentral.com

1960 births
Living people
Buffalo Sabres draft picks
Buffalo Sabres players
Calgary Flames coaches
Canadian ice hockey coaches
Canadian ice hockey goaltenders
Chicago Blackhawks players
Colorado Avalanche coaches
French Quebecers
Ice hockey people from Quebec
Quebec Nordiques players
Rochester Americans players
Sportspeople from Rouyn-Noranda
Stanley Cup champions
Trois-Rivières Draveurs players